Wise is an unincorporated community in Van Zandt County, Texas, United States. According to the Handbook of Texas, the community had a population of 29 in 2000. It is located within the Dallas/Fort Worth Metroplex.

History
Wise was first settled by a Norwegian colony in 1848 and was known as Fourmile Prairie. A post office was established here as early as 1856 and remained in operation until 1917 when it received mail from Prairieville. Henry A. Wise served as the postmaster and the community was named for him on March 11, 1889. 16 families lived here in 1854. It had a general store and 25 residents in the 1930s. A second business opened in 1947. In 1936, the community had one business and several scattered houses. Only the homes were shown on a map of the community in 1981. Its population was 29 from 1990 through 2000.

Geography

Education
Wise School was established in 1890 and had 79 students in 1904. Since 1949, it has been served by the Mabank Independent School District.

References

Unincorporated communities in Van Zandt County, Texas
Unincorporated communities in Texas